Nipponophloeus is a genus of beetles in the family Laemophloeidae, containing the following species:

 Nipponophloeus boninensis Nakane
 Nipponophloeus dorcoides Reitter

References

Laemophloeidae